Koser may refer to:

 Anja Koser (born 1970), German handball and football player
 Fatma Koşer Kaya (born 1968), Dutch lawyer and politician of Turkish origin
 Ralf Koser (born 1973), German judoka
 several Yugoslavian sailplanes designed by Jaroslav Koser:
 Koser-Hrovat KB-1 Triglav
 Koser KB-3 Jadran
 Koserbach (other name Koser), a river of Bavaria, Germany, tributary of the Schorgast
 Großer Koserbach, uppercourse name of the Koserbach
 Kleiner Koserbach, tributary of the Koserbach